Eltersdorf station is a railway station in Eltersdorf, a district of Erlangen in Bavaria, Germany. The station is on the Nuremberg–Bamberg line of Deutsche Bahn.

References

Railway stations in Bavaria
Erlangen